Bryan Maximiliano Aldave Benítez (born 29 September 1983) is a Uruguayan footballer who plays for Peruvian club Cultural Santa Rosa as a forward.

Club career
Born in Montevideo, Aldave graduated from hometown's Montevideo Wanderers, and made his senior debuts in 2000, with the club in Segunda División Profesional. In January 2004 he joined Primera División side Rocha.

In January 2005 Aldave moved abroad for the first time of his career, signing with Venezuelan Primera División side Estudiantes de Mérida. In June, however, he moved teams and countries again, joining Cobreloa in Chilean Primera División.

Aldave returned to Uruguay in January 2006, back to former club Rocha. After  seasons with the club, he moved back to Venezuela, signing with Trujillanos. On 15 January 2008 Aldave left South America and joined Premier Soccer League side Mamelodi Sundowns in South Africa. Despite appearing regularly for the side, he was transfer listed in August, and subsequently left the club in January 2009, returning to Estudiantes de Mérida.

In the 2010 summer Aldave moved to fellow top divisioner Zamora; in January of the following year, however, he switched teams and countries again, joining Nacional Potosí in Liga de Fútbol Profesional Boliviano. On 7 March 2012 Aldave signed with Deportivo Pasto, but left the club in August after appearing only once, and joined Sud América, back to his homeland.

On 13 January 2013 Aldave moved to Monagas, being released on 17 June. On 14 August he signed with Fénix.

On 11 January 2014, after being sparingly used by Fénix, Aldave moved back to Nacional Potosí. After finishing the campaign as the club's topscorer, he joined Portuguesa in May, with the deal being effective in July.

On 25 December 2014, after suffering relegation with Lusa, Aldave joined Persiba Balikpapan in Indonesia. He left the club in February of the following year and returned to his home country and Sud América in the following month, with the side back to the top level.

References

External links
 
 
 
 
 

1983 births
Living people
Footballers from Montevideo
Uruguayan footballers
Association football forwards
Uruguayan Primera División players
Montevideo Wanderers F.C. players
Rocha F.C. players
Centro Atlético Fénix players
Venezuelan Primera División players
Estudiantes de Mérida players
Trujillanos FC players
Zamora FC players
Monagas S.C. players
Chilean Primera División players
Cobreloa footballers
Mamelodi Sundowns F.C. players
Nacional Potosí players
Categoría Primera A players
Deportivo Pasto footballers
Campeonato Brasileiro Série B players
Associação Portuguesa de Desportos players
Persiba Balikpapan players
Uruguay youth international footballers
Uruguayan expatriate footballers
Expatriate footballers in Venezuela
Expatriate footballers in Chile
Expatriate soccer players in South Africa
Expatriate footballers in Bolivia
Expatriate footballers in Colombia
Expatriate footballers in Brazil
Expatriate footballers in Indonesia
Expatriate footballers in Peru
Uruguayan expatriate sportspeople in Venezuela
Uruguayan expatriate sportspeople in Chile
Uruguayan expatriate sportspeople in South Africa
Uruguayan expatriate sportspeople in Bolivia
Uruguayan expatriate sportspeople in Colombia
Uruguayan expatriate sportspeople in Brazil
Uruguayan expatriate sportspeople in Peru